Jessica Williams (born April 29, 1985), known professionally as Punkie Johnson, is an American stand-up comedian, actress, and writer based in New York City. Johnson began her career as a stand-up comedian at The Comedy Store in California, before becoming a featured player on the NBC sketch comedy series Saturday Night Live for its 46th season in 2020. She was promoted to repertory status in 2022, ahead of the show's 48th season.

Early life
Johnson, born Jessica Williams, was raised by her mother, Mary Johnson, in New Orleans, Louisiana, where she attended Catholic and public schools, graduating in May 2003 from McDonogh 35 High School. Johnson studied at Nicholls State University in Thibodaux, Louisiana, where she graduated in May 2008 with a Bachelor’s Degree in General Studies.

Career
Johnson began her career as a stand-up comedian. She later joined The Comedy Store in Los Angeles as a paid regular. In 2019, Johnson performed at Just for Laughs.

As an actress, Johnson appeared in various television series such as Space Force, A Black Lady Sketch Show, Corporate, and Adam Ruins Everything.

Saturday Night Live
In 2020, Johnson was cast as a featured player on Saturday Night Live, starting in its forty-sixth season. She was promoted to repertory status in 2022 before the beginning of the 48th season. Johnson is the eighth black female cast member in the show's history, the second black LGBT woman to be a cast member (following Danitra Vance, who was not publicly out during her lifetime), and the seventh LGBT cast member overall. She was promoted to repertory status at the beginning of the show's forty-eighth season.

Personal life
Johnson is a lesbian as well as identifying within the queer community. She and her wife had been partnered since 2002, but in a 2022 episode of the podcast Films To Be Buried With she revealed she was in the middle of divorce proceedings and had since begun a new relationship.  According to an interview with NBC News, Johnson identifies strongly with lesbianism: “I’m just this little lesbian chick from New Orleans who is just enjoying life doing comedy and thinking that’s it.”

Filmography

See also
 LGBT culture in New York City
 List of LGBT people from New York City

References

External links

Living people
21st-century American actresses
21st-century American comedians
African-American actresses
African-American stand-up comedians
African-American writers
American sketch comedians
American stand-up comedians
American women comedians
Writers from New Orleans
Actresses from New Orleans
Comedians from Louisiana
American lesbian actresses
American lesbian writers
LGBT African Americans
LGBT people from Louisiana
Lesbian comedians
1985 births
21st-century African-American women
21st-century African-American people
20th-century African-American people
20th-century African-American women
African-American women writers
American LGBT comedians